The Art of Lying is the second studio album by Manchester post-punk band Ist Ist. It was released on 26 November 2021 by Kind Violence Records. Including live material, this is the group's seventh album-length release. It is their first album to chart in the UK.

Background 
Ist Ist recorded the album during the multiple lockdowns of 2020. It was announced in August 2021 and was released on 26 November 2021. The following week, the album became Ist Ist's first charting release, after entering the UK Albums Chart at number 87. The cover of the album features the Eye of Shinjuku. 

The Art of Lying continues themes of mental health issues and psychogeography found in their first studio album, Architecture, written during various lockdown stages. It also features anti-establishment and anti-capitalist themes.

Reviews 
Positive reviews followed the album's release. Tony Clayton-Lea of The Irish Times gave it 4/5 stars, positively comparing it to Joy Division calling their music 'a strain of solid-gold integrity and commitment.' French music publication Sound of Violence gave the album 3/5.

Callum Reid, writing for OriginalRock.net, called the album 'strong, solid and very listenable,' and compared it to the music of Joy Division and Ultravox.

Imogen Lawlor, writing for Vinyl Chapters, was less favourable towards the album, commenting that the music let down the album's critical lyrical themes.

'Josh' for RGM praised the album, but said it was lacking dynamically.

Track listing

Personnel 
 Recorded by Michael Whalley

Charts

References

2021 albums